The Lea County Courthouse  is an historic Art deco courthouse building located at 100 North Main Avenue in Lovington, New Mexico. It was designed in 1936 by architect Orville R. Walker of Lubbock and built by W. S. Moss. Until December, 1984, its second and third floors housed the county jail.

On December 7, 1987, it was added to the National Register of Historic Places.

See also

National Register of Historic Places listings in Lea County, New Mexico

References

Courthouses on the National Register of Historic Places in New Mexico
Government buildings completed in 1936
Buildings and structures in Lea County, New Mexico
County courthouses in New Mexico
Art Deco courthouses
Art Deco architecture in New Mexico
National Register of Historic Places in Lea County, New Mexico